Oak Hills Local School District is a public school district in Hamilton County, Ohio that includes Delhi Township and about half of Green Township. , 7,899 students attended its nine schools.  Approximately 2,594 attend its only high school annually, making it one of the largest of Greater Cincinnati's suburban public high schools.

The Oak Hills Local School Board is composed of a Board President, Vice-President, and three Members.

Schools
Oak Hills High School
Bridgetown Middle School
Delhi Middle School
Rapid Run Middle School
Charles W. Springmyer Elementary School
C.O. Harrison Elementary School
Delshire Elementary School
John Foster Dulles Elementary School
Oakdale Elementary School

References

External links
Oak Hills Local School District official site

School districts in Ohio
Education in Cincinnati
Education in Hamilton County, Ohio